The Republican Party (Timorese: Partidu Republikanu) is a political party in East Timor. In the parliamentary election held on 30 June 2007, the party won 1.06% of the total votes and did not win any seats in parliament, as it did not reach the 3% threshold to win seats.

References

Political parties in East Timor